Pedro López Galisteo (born 21 January 1995) is a Spanish professional footballer who plays as a goalkeeper for Extremadura UD.

Club career
Born in Mérida, Extremadura, López joined Real Betis' academy in 2010 at the age of 15, after starting out at local club Mérida UD. In October 2012, while still a junior, he was called up to train with the first team by coach Pepe Mel.

López returned to the youth squad, but made his senior debut with the reserves on 9 December 2012, starting in a 0–4 away loss against Sevilla Atlético. After spending the whole 2013–14 campaign between the B side and the youth setup, he first appeared in La Liga with the first team on 11 May 2014, coming on as an 84th-minute substitute for the injured Antonio Adán in a 4–3 home win over Real Valladolid, as the Andalusians were already relegated as dead last.

On 26 August 2016, López was loaned to Segunda División B club Atlético Sanluqueño CF. The following 6 July, after returning to Betis B who now competed in the third tier, he renewed his link for a further year.

On 22 April 2018, with starter Adán sidelined due to physical problems, López replaced injured Dani Giménez late into the first half of the league fixture away to Atlético Madrid, and kept a clean sheet in a 0–0 draw. On 3 July, he terminated his contract.

López moved to another reserve team on 30 August 2018, after agreeing to a one-year deal with Deportivo Fabril of the third division. After their relegation, he signed a three-year contract with Burgos CF in the same league.

After a spell with CF Villanovense in the 2020-21 season, López moved to Extremadura UD on 5 July 2021.

References

External links

Beticopedia profile 

1995 births
Living people
People from Mérida, Spain
Sportspeople from the Province of Badajoz
Footballers from Extremadura
Spanish footballers
Association football goalkeepers
La Liga players
Segunda División B players
Tercera División players
Mérida UD footballers
Betis Deportivo Balompié footballers
Real Betis players
Atlético Sanluqueño CF players
Deportivo Fabril players
Burgos CF footballers
CF Villanovense players
Extremadura UD footballers